Amp is a music video program on MTV that aired from 1996 to 2001. It was aimed at the electronic music and rave crowd and was responsible for exposing many electronica acts to the mainstream. When co-creator Todd Mueller (who had worked on this with V. Owen Bush, Amy Finnerty and show co-creator Burle Avant) left the show in 1998, it was redubbed Amp 2.0. The show aired some 46 episodes in total over its 6-year run.  In its final two years, reruns were usually shown from earlier years.  Amp's time slot was moved around quite a bit, but the show usually aired late at night or in the early morning hours on the weekend.  Because of this late night time slot, the show developed a small but cult like following.  A few online groups formed after the show's demise to ask MTV to bring the show back and air it during normal hours, but MTV never responded to the requests.

Format
The show was possibly inspired by the underground public access show "TV w/ Ray Cathode" (later named Dizzy TV) that started airing on Manhattan Neighborhood Network public access TV in 1993 and ran from 1993–1999. TV w/ Ray Cathode was an underground experimental television show created by Beau Tardy that aired abstract video imagery with electronic music soundtracks by FAX +49-69/450464, Thomas Fehlmann, Sun Electric, The Orb, Aphex Twin, Warp Records and many others. TV w/ Ray Cathode show producer Beau Tardy also worked at MTV and was a colleague of Todd Mueller but never contributed to Amp.

The format of the show strongly resembled the original MTV model of broadcasting primarily music videos, but without VJs to host. The show started with an intro and logo, some basic information about that week's show contents via onscreen text, then an hour of electronic music was played before the show's conclusion. Most of the video clips were created specifically for Amp. Nick Philip, a San-Francisco based multi-media artist created the first video for Amp, "Meccano" by Sun Electric.<ref>Darren Keast: Computer World. East Bay Express, August 29, 2001</ref> Occasionally, non-electronic but still classic music videos were aired for the sake of nostalgia within the electronic genre, such as Ofra Haza's music video for "Im Nin'Alu," which was sampled by several electronic artists in the early 1990s.

Compilations
The show was popular enough that MTV produced two compilations of songs by artists featured on Amp. MTV's Amp was released in 1997 and MTV's Amp 2'' came out a year later in 1998. Both albums were released by Caroline Records.

Artists commonly featured on the show

1.8.7
Aphex Twin
Astral Projection
Atari Teenage Riot
Autechre
Aux 88
Banco de Gaia
Brian Eno
Chemical Brothers
Coldcut
Crystal Method
Daft Punk
Dr. Octagon
Emergency Broadcast Network
Faithless
Fluke
The Future Sound of London
Goldie
GusGus
Ken Ishii
Kraftwerk
Josh Wink
Juno Reactor
Moby
Orbital
The Orb
The Prodigy
Roni Size
Speedy J
Tipsy
Tranquility Bass
Tricky
Underworld

References

External links
Complete episode guide to videos played on Amp; includes partial guide to Amp 2.0

1990s American music television series
2000s American music television series
MTV original programming
Dance television shows
1996 American television series debuts
2001 American television series endings